, daylight saving time (DST) is permanently observed in Morocco. Previously, time was advanced to UTC+01:00 at 02:00 on the last Sunday of March, and reverted to UTC±00:00 (standard time), defined as Greenwich Mean Time locally, at 03:00 on the last Sunday of October. This practice was continued through October 2018, after which clocks were permanently advanced. An exception was made during the month of Ramadan during which clocks reverted to UTC+00:00 (standard time).

For 2014, these dates were:
 29 March – advance to UTC+01:00 (DST)
 28 June – return to UTC+00:00 (start of Ramadan)
 2 August – advance to UTC+01:00 (end of Ramadan)
 26 October – return to UTC+00:00 (standard time)

History

 2008: DST began on 1 June and ended on 1 September. This was the first time Morocco had used daylight saving time since 1978.
 2009: DST began on 1 June and ended on 21 August.
 2010: DST began on 2 May and ended on 8 August, just before Ramadan, as had been the case in recent years.
 2011: DST began on 2 April at midnight and ended on 31 July at midnight.
 2012: On 8 March 2012, the Moroccan Cabinet approved a bill for the permanent adoption of DST with predictable start and finish dates. However, before the start of DST, they changed it to advance to UTC+01:00 at 02:00 on the last Sunday of April, and return to UTC at 03:00 on the last Sunday of September, with the exception of the holy month of Ramadan, during which DST will not be observed. As a result, the time changes in 2012 were:
 29 April – advance to UTC+01:00 (DST)
 20 July – return to UTC+00:00 (start of Ramadan)
 20 August – advance to UTC+01:00 (end of Ramadan)
 30 September – return to UTC+00:00 (standard time)
 2013: DST followed the 2012 law at first:
 28 April – advance to UTC+01:00 (DST)
 7 July – return to UTC+00:00 (start of Ramadan)
 10 August – advance to UTC+01:00 (end of Ramadan)
28 September – The government announced a change in policy, which moved the end of DST from the last Sunday in September (which was to be the next day) to the last Sunday in October (27 October). At the same time, they moved the beginning of DST back to the last Sunday in March (next 30 March 2014). As usual, advancements to DST (UTC+01:00) occurred at 02:00 and returns to standard time (UTC+00:00) occurred at 03:00.
2018: Switch to permanent DST:  On 26 October in a government decree, the government changed UTC offset for Morocco Time Zone, Morocco Time Zone now use UTC+01:00 all year round except during Ramadan. However, this decree mandates permanent daylight saving time.

References

See also

Time in Morocco
Morocco